The following are country calling codes in Algeria.

Dialing pattern

Fixed-line (landline) numbers
Calls within an area code (The area code is a 2 digits number, i.e. 21, 41, 46 0 THE-AREA-CODE xx xx xx
Calls to Algiers from other area codes 021 xx xx xx
Calls from outside Algeria ("yy" is the area code) +213 yy xx xx xx

Mobile numbers
Calls from Algeria ("y" is the operator code, 5 for Ooredoo, 6 for Mobilis, 7 for Djezzy) 0yxx xx xx xx

Calls from outside Algeria +213 yxx xx xx xx

List of area codes in Algeria

References

External links
ITU allocations list
Algerian dial codes - accessed 26 April 2010.
New plan
Algerian Tourism code list

Algeria
Telecommunications in Algeria
Telephone numbers